Bobs Creek or Bob's Creek may refer to:

In Canada
Bob's Creek (Ontario), a tributary of Porcupine Lake
Bobs Creek (Ontario), a tributary of Shallow River

In the United States
Bobs Creek (Lincoln County, Missouri)
Bobs Creek (Meramec River), a stream in Missouri
Bobs Creek (Pennsylvania), a tributary of Dunning Creek